Thomas Karadimos (born 16 October 1953) is a Greek alpine skier. He competed in three events at the 1976 Winter Olympics.

References

External links
 

1953 births
Living people
Greek male alpine skiers
Olympic alpine skiers of Greece
Alpine skiers at the 1976 Winter Olympics
Place of birth missing (living people)